The Strzelecki railway line was a 49 km steam-era branch railway line in Victoria, Australia.  The line opened in June 1922, branching off the former Great Southern Railway (South Gippsland line) at Koo Wee Rup Station.  The main line branched off the current Pakenham line at Dandenong, extending out into the South Gippsland region.

Construction 

Opening and description 
The Strzelecki line opened on 29 June 1922, serving the farms of the Strzelecki Ranges. Sheep and/or cattle loading facilities were provided at all stations except Heath Hill, with goods loading and storage facilities at all stations except Athlone. 

Two years after the line opened, two goods sidings, situated between Koo Wee Rup and Bayles, were provided: Plowrights siding and Water Washed Sand siding. Narrow-gauge tramlines ran from both sidings to the main Koo Wee Rup drain, and were used for transporting river-washed sand to the main line. Both Plowrights and Water Washed Sand sidings closed in 1931.

Bayles was the first station on the line, situated in light scrub just south of the township. The following station was Catani, now just a mound of earth where the platform was. Yannathan platform was 11.5 km from Koo Wee Rup, and Heath Hill was a further 2.4 km along the line. Athlone Quarry Siding, 94.14 km from Melbourne, was opened with the line, but closed three years later. Athlone station was 2.4 km further along the line, followed by Topiram.

Triholm, 106.6 km from Melbourne, became the terminus of the line after the section beyond was closed on 22 November 1930. Beyond Triholm, the line featured steep grades and sharp curves.

The original terminus station at Strezlecki had a 53-foot turntable. After Strzelecki station's closure, no other station on the line was supplied with a turntable, requiring trains to run tender-first in the down direction and returning to Koo Wee Rup engine-first.

Closures 
The Strzelecki line turned out to be one of the shorter-lived lines in Victoria.  The section between Triholm to Strzelecki closed due to a trestle bridge developing a large sway every time a train ran over it, with the cost of repairs deemed uneconomical in view of the light traffic. The section of track from Yannathan to Triholm was closed on 7 August 1941, after flooding of the Lang Lang River resulted in damage to one of the four trestle bridges over the river.  Next to close was the section from Bayles to Yannathan, on 15 April 1950. The line to Bayles was kept open until 4 February 1959 to serve a butter factory.

See also 
 List of closed railway stations in Victoria
 Transportation in Australia
Strzelecki (disambiguation)

References 

Closed regional railway lines in Victoria (Australia)
Railway lines opened in 1922
Transport in Gippsland (region)
Shire of Baw Baw